Theater Heilbronn  is a theatre in Heilbronn, Baden-Württemberg, Germany.

Theatres in Baden-Württemberg